Paulls Valley is a suburb of Perth, Western Australia within the City of Kalamunda. It was officially named in 1973 and commemorates Albert Paull, an early orchardist who settled in the district in 1914.

Bounded to the north by the Helena River valley the main access to the locality is from the Mundaring Weir Road, which bounds Paulls Valley to the south.

Notable people
 Edgar Dell – botanical artist

References

Suburbs of Perth, Western Australia
Darling Range
Suburbs in the City of Kalamunda